James E. McClellan (March 22, 1926 – November 26, 2016) was an American veterinarian and politician.

Born in Frederick, Maryland, McClellan served in the United States Army during World War II. He went to University of Maryland and then received his bachelor's degree in veterinary medicine from University of Georgia in 1955. McClellan practiced veterinarian medicine in Frederick, Maryland. He served on the Frederick city council. From 1978 to 1994, McClellan represented District 3B in the Maryland House of Delegates and was a Democrat. McClellan died in Frederick, Maryland.

Notes

1926 births
2016 deaths
Politicians from Frederick, Maryland
Military personnel from Maryland
University of Georgia alumni
University System of Maryland alumni
American veterinarians
Male veterinarians
Maryland city council members
Democratic Party members of the Maryland House of Delegates
United States Army personnel of World War II